Eddy Prend Le Maillot Jaune (Eddy Takes the Yellow Jersey) is a 1969 song by Pierre-André Gil about the cycling champion Eddy Merckx, inspired by his first victory in the 1969 Tour de France contest that same year. The song was released on the label Monopole. The B-side was called Mamma Mamma Mia.

Lyrics

The song praises Merckx' talent and victories.

Chart performance

Eddy Prend Le Maillot Jaune entered the ninth place in the Walloon music charts on 9 September 1969. In 1971 Gil would record another song about Merckx named Eddy Est Imbattable!.

Sources

1969 songs
1969 singles
Belgian pop songs
French-language Belgian songs
Songs about Belgium
Songs about Eddy Merckx
Songs about bicycles
Cycling music
Tour de France mass media
Cultural depictions of Eddy Merckx
Song articles with missing songwriters